, also known as The Broken Commandment, is a Japanese manga series written by Suzuki Matsuo and illustrated by Naoki Yamamoto. It was serialized in Shogakukan's seinen manga magazine Monthly Ikki from April to October 2004, with its chapters collected in a single volume.

Publication
Written by Suzuki Matsuo and illustrated by Naoki Yamamoto, Hakai was serialized in Shogakukan's seinen manga magazine Monthly Ikki from April 24 to October 25, 2004. Shogakukan collected its chapters in a single volume released on February 28, 2005. The manga was reissued by East Press and released on November 17, 2016.

It has been licensed in France by Atelier Akatombo.

References

Further reading
 
 
 

Seinen manga
Shogakukan manga